Ewedu soup is a soup created by the Yoruba ethnic group. It is made from jute leaf, hence it is known as jute leaf soup. Similar to Okra soup, the soup is mucilaginous in texture and is a typical accompaniment to Nigerian beef stew and fish stew.
Pluck jute leaf rinse with water and blend, then add crayfish, locust bean also known as iru and salt to give it desired taste. Ensure you do not add too much water, also you can ignore the use ijabe (traditional broom) used to pound and kaun (potash) since you are using a blender.

Preparation of Ewedu soup 

You will need the following ingredients to make ewedu soup :

 Fresh jute leaf
 Water
 Locust bean
 Crayfish
 Salt
 Bouillon powder

After plucking a fresh jute leaf, rinse and drain water until there is no more sand in them by packing the leaf leaving remnants of sand and particle inside the water. You can choose to boil the Ewedu leaf until tender to ease blending.

You can result to the use of Ijabe, which is a traditional broom used to pound Ewedu until smooth however a faster and more slimy result can be gotten with the use of blender. Simply pour the jute leaves into blender, add little water to prevent it from been too watery and blend till smooth.

Suitable swallow food 

Ewedu soup best goes with fufu, Amala and pounded yam.

Gallery

See also 
okra soup
jute

Related article

Oncagious

Amala (food)

iru (food)

References

Further reading

External links 
Yoruba Ewedu soup

Vegetable soups
African soups
Yoruba cuisine